The Dilberito was a vegan microwave burrito introduced in 1999 by Scott Adams Foods, Inc. and named after the comic strip character Dilbert. The product went out of production in 2003.

First announced in The Dilbert Future and introduced in 1999, the Dilberito came in flavors of Mexican, Indian, Barbecue, and Garlic & Herb. It was sold through some health food stores.

Concept 

Scott Adams' inspiration for the product was that "diet is the number one cause of health-related problems in the world. I figured I could put a dent in that problem and make some money at the same time." His aim was to create a healthy food product that also had mass appeal, a concept he called "the blue jeans of food".

Promotion 

A Flash game titled Dilberito was developed and published by Blam! Video Game Development in 2000 for Scott Adams Foods, Inc.

Reception
The product failed to catch on in the market, leading Adams "several years and several million dollars later" to sell off his intellectual property and exit the business. Adams himself noted, "[t]he mineral fortification was hard to disguise, and because of the veggie and legume content, three bites of the Dilberito made you fart so hard your intestines formed a tail." The New York Times noted the burrito "could have been designed only by a food technologist or by someone who eats lunch without much thought to taste."

References

Dilbert
Food product brands
Flash games